The Electoral district of Ringarooma was a single-member electoral district of the Tasmanian House of Assembly. It centred on the town of Ringarooma in north-eastern Tasmania.

The seat was created in a redistribution ahead of the 1886 election out of parts of the seats of George Town, Selby and Fingal, and was abolished when the Tasmanian parliament adopted the Hare-Clark electoral model in 1909.

Members for Ringarooma

References
 
 
 Parliament of Tasmania (2006). The Parliament of Tasmania from 1956

Former electoral districts of Tasmania
1886 establishments in Australia
1909 disestablishments in Australia